The 2013 NASCAR Toyota Series was the seventh season of the NASCAR Toyota Series, and the tenth organized by NASCAR Mexico. The season was composed by fifteen races. For first time, the series raced outside of Mexico, with a race in the Phoenix International Raceway. Jorge Goeters returned as reigning champion, and took part in the 2013 UNOH Battle at the Beach. 
Rodrigo Peralta was the champion of 2013 season and Santiago Tovar was declared the Rookie of the Year.

Changes

Desafio

After ten races the Top-8 championship drivers and 2 wild card drivers were selected for a five-race "Chase system".

Teams and drivers

Schedule

In 2013, Phoenix International Raceway was added to the schedule, marking the first event in Toyota Series history to be held in the United States. All the Mexican venues of 2012 season returned, and three races were held at night (Phoenix, Mexico City and Chihuahua). A 2nd race at El Dorado Speedway (Chihuahua) was supposed to be run at September 29 but was later cancelled and replaced by Autódromo Chiapas.

‡ Night Race

Results and standings

Races

Drivers

(key) Bold – Pole position awarded by time. Italics – Pole position set by final practice results. * – Most laps led. ** – All laps led. 

Notes
1 – Waldemar Coronas suffered a 10-point penalty.
2 – Santiago Tovar and Héctor González received championship points, despite the fact that they did not qualify for the race.

See also
2013 NASCAR Sprint Cup Series
2013 NASCAR Nationwide Series
2013 NASCAR Camping World Truck Series
2013 NASCAR K&N Pro Series East
2013 NASCAR K&N Pro Series West
2013 ARCA Racing Series
2013 NASCAR Canadian Tire Series
2013 NASCAR Whelen Euro Series

References

NASCAR Toyota Series

NASCAR Mexico Series